The 2001–02 season saw Dundee compete in the Scottish Premier League where they finished in 9th position with 44 points.

Final league table

Results
Dundee's score comes first

Legend

Scottish Premier League

Scottish Cup

Scottish League Cup

UEFA Intertoto Cup

References

External links
 Dundee 2001–02 at Soccerbase.com (select relevant season from dropdown list)

Dundee F.C. seasons
Dundee